Bucculatrix citima is a moth in the family Bucculatricidae. It was described by Svetlana Seksjaeva in 1989. It is found in the Russian Far East (Primorsky Krai) and Japan (Hokkaido, Honshu).

The wingspan is 6–7 mm. The forewings are white with some dark red brown irrorations. The hindwings are grey.

The larvae feed on Rhamnus davurica and Rhamnus japonica. They mine the leaves of their host plant. The young larvae form a spiral linear mine. Pupation takes place in a greyish brown or whitish wine red cocoon.

References

Natural History Museum Lepidoptera generic names catalog

Bucculatricidae
Moths described in 1989
Moths of Asia
Moths of Japan